Love on the Rocks is an LP album by Julie London, released by Liberty Records under catalog number LRP-3249 as a monophonic recording in 1963, and later in stereo under catalog number LST-7249 the same year.

Basic tracks were recorded at Liberty Records' new Chicago studios in three late-night sessions after Julie had finished her evening live performances at Mister Kelly's nightclub. Additional tracks were recorded later in Los Angeles, where arranger Pete King also added orchestral overdubs.

Track listing

Selected personnel
 Julie London - vocals
 Jack Sheldon - trumpet
 John Gray - guitar
 Chuck Berghofer - double bass
 Kenny Hume - drums
 Pete King - arranger, conductor

Notes

References

Owen, Michael (2017). Go Slow: The Life of Julie London. Chicago Review Press.

Liberty Records albums
1963 albums
Julie London albums
Albums produced by Snuff Garrett